Series 30 of University Challenge began on 4 September 2000, with the final on 2 April 2001.

Results
 Winning teams are highlighted in bold.
 Teams with green scores (winners) returned in the next round, while those with red scores (losers) were eliminated.
 Teams with orange scores have lost, but survived as the first round losers with the highest losing scores.
 A score in italics indicates a match decided on a tie-breaker question.

First round

Highest Scoring Losers Playoffs

Second round

An error in the scoring led to University College Oxford going through to the quarterfinals instead of Birkbeck College – University College was not penalised for an incorrect interruption.

Quarter-finals

Semi-finals

Final

 The trophy and title were awarded to the Imperial team comprising Siegfried Hodgson, John Douglas, Gavin Estcourt and Alexander Campbell.
 The trophy was presented by the then-Poet Laureate Andrew Motion.

References

External links
 University Challenge Homepage
 Blanchflower Results Table

2000
2000 British television seasons
2001 British television seasons